Uncial 0278 (in the Gregory-Aland numbering), is a Greek uncial manuscript of the New Testament. Paleographically it has been assigned to the 9th century.

Description 
The codex contains the text of the Pauline epistles with numerous lacunae, on 120 parchment leaves (24.2 cm by 18.2 cm). It contains Romans 1:5-9, 24-30; 1 Corinthians 7:37-8:6; 2 Cor 13:3-12; Galatians 1:1 -2:16, 6:11-18; Ephesians 1:1-8, 16 - 2:5; 4:30 - Phil 3:4; Colossians 1:23 - 2 Thess. 3:18; Titus 2:11-3:2, 3:8 - Hebrews 10:12. It is a Greek-Arabic diglot, with the Greek text in the first of two columns per page, 20-22 lines per page, in uncial letters. It is a palimpsest, the lower text containing theological writings.

Currently it is dated by the INTF to the 9th century.

Location 
It is one of the manuscripts discovered in Saint Catherine's Monastery, Sinai in May 1975, during restoration work. Currently the codex is housed at the monastery (N.E. ΜΓ 2).

See also 

 List of New Testament uncials
 Biblical manuscript
 Textual criticism

References

Further reading 

 

Greek New Testament uncials
Palimpsests
9th-century biblical manuscripts